West Point Grey Academy is an independent, co-educational, day school founded in 1996. Located in Vancouver, British Columbia, Canada. It delivers the British Columbia Ministry of Education curriculum from Junior-Kindergarten to Grade 12.

History 
West Point Grey Academy was founded in 1996 by Andrew Chan, Peter Wong, Michael Choi, and Elsie Sze.

The school yearbook is called The View.

Notable staff
Justin Trudeau, Prime Minister of Canada; taught math, humanities, social studies, French and drama at the school from 1999 to 2002. Trudeau was photographed in black-face during his time as a teacher at WPGA.
Mariam Matossian, Armenian folk music singer.

Athletics 
All students from Junior-Kindergarten to Grade 12 are enrolled in Physical Education classes. The WPGA campus features a gymnasium, pool, fitness centre, two outdoor tennis courts, multi-sport fields, and a 1.5 km outdoor running/walking trail. Main sports include soccer, basketball, volleyball, cross-country, swimming, track and field, golf, and tennis.

WPGA fields a variety of athletic teams from grade 5 through grade 12 competing as members of the Canadian Association of Independent Schools. School teams also compete in local city and independent school leagues and are also registered in the 'A' and 'AA' divisions of the BC School Sports Provincial Championships.

WPGA won their first high school provincial championship banner in fall 2010 with their varsity girls cross-country team capturing the 'AAA' BC High-School Cross-Country Championships title. The varsity girls cross-country team brought home their second consecutive banner after successfully defending their title on November 5, 2011.

Film and Performing Arts 
West Point Grey Academy's Fine and Performing Arts faculty is hosted in a dedicated Arts Wing (made up of several visual arts studios, a ceramics room, band room, drama room, choir room, recording studio, and wood-shop).

Since 1997 the school's drama program has annually produced a large scale production with ticket sales open to the Greater Vancouver community.  In 2005, the school produced its first musical, The Sound of Music, and has since strived to produce a musical every other year. In 2007 it put on The Wizard of Oz at the Richmond Gateway Theatre. The department put on Jane Austen's Pride and Prejudice as adapted for the stage in 2009 with a production of Anne of Green Gables in 2010. In 2014, WPGA produced the musical, Grease. Their production in 2017 was Auntie Mame. In 2018, it was "Into The Woods." In 2020, it was "The 25th Annual Putnam Country Spelling Bee."

The school's band and strings programs are quickly growing, regularly performing in the community. In April 2007 the school's concert band and choirs undertook their first international band trip to Disneyland in Anaheim, California. They've been going to numerous festivals and competitions every year including Kiwanis and Con Brio.

Every May the school hosts a week-long celebration of the arts called Arts Week.  During this week, classes are shortened to allow for artistic workshops and guest artists to give presentations.  The evenings also feature large scale musical productions, including Coffee House Night, Mic-Night, and Cabaret Night.

Community service 

The school and its student body continually stress the importance of community stewardship.  The school hosts groups which regularly volunteer at the Union Gospel Mission as well as other local community based initiatives.  In March 2006, six students and two teachers joined a Canadian team to travel to Tanzania to summit Mount Kilimanjaro in order to raise funds for the Stephen Lewis Foundation. They worked to generate HIV/AIDS Awareness in schools around the Lower Mainland, and succeeded in raising over $40,000 for charity. West Point Grey Academy was also responsible for reinstating the Vancouver Independent Schools' Charity Ball in February 2005, and in July 2007 successfully completed a school-building service trip to Ecuador. During the 2006-2007 school year, a number of WPGA students collaborated to plan, organize, and run Urban Aid, a benefit concert to raise money for Covenant House Vancouver. The concert showcased a number of Vancouver independent groups and artists, and was attended by over 300 high school students from around the Lower Mainland. The event raised over $5,000 for charity.

Debate and public speaking 
WPGA's senior school competitive debate team is one of the most decorated teams on the national circuit. As the current home of the 2015 Canadian national champions, WPGA has won the national title more times than any other school. WPGA debaters have also qualified as one of two Canadian teams at the Oxford Finals (U.K. championships) five times in the past seven years, and six national debate squad teams, which represent Canada at the World Schools Debate Championships, have included WPGA students. Most recently, WPGA '15 alumni Lloyd Lyall was a member of the national debate team that appeared in the Grand Finals of the 2015 World Championship in Singapore. WPGA head coach, Ms. Tracey Lee, was national team coach from 2009 to 2011 and led the team that captured the 2010 World Champions title.

WPGA's public speaking team has also experienced significant success at the provincial, national and international levels. WPGA '15 alumni Samantha Starkey won the 2015 Canadian public speaking championships, en route to capturing the 2015 WIDPSC World Championship title. 

The school's Model UN team has competed at a number of international competitions including the National High School MUN (New York), Harvard Model UN (Cambridge), SSUNS McGill, and Harvard Model Congress in Athens, Greece and Brussels, Belgium. In addition to receiving a number of delegate awards, the team has also received notable acclamation as the Top International Delegation at the Harvard Model United Nations in both 2005 and 2006 and McGill's SSUNS in 2008. The school's Model UN program hosts its own conference, - the Vancouver Youth Model United Nations (VYMUN) - every October.

References

External links
Official site

High schools in Vancouver
Elementary schools in Vancouver
Private schools in British Columbia
Educational institutions established in 1996
1996 establishments in British Columbia